The 2015 Virginia Tech Hokies baseball team represented Virginia Tech during the 2015 NCAA Division I baseball season. The Hokies  played their home games at English Field as a member of the Atlantic Coast Conference. They were led by head coach Pat Mason, in his second season at Virginia Tech.

Previous season
In 2014, the Hokies finished the season 7th in the ACC's Coastal Division with a record of 21–31–1, 9–21 in conference play. They failed to qualify for the 2014 Atlantic Coast Conference baseball tournament or the 2014 NCAA Division I baseball tournament.

Personnel

Roster

Coaching staff

Schedule

! style="background:#721227;color:white;"| Regular Season
|- valign="top" 

|- align="center" bgcolor=""
| 1 || February 13 || at  ||  || Claude Smith Field • Macon, GA ||  ||  ||  ||  ||  ||  ||
|- align="center" bgcolor=""
| 2 || February 14 || at Mercer ||  || Claude Smith Field • Macon, GA ||  ||  ||  ||  ||  ||  ||
|- align="center" bgcolor=""
| 3 || February 15 || at Mercer ||  || Claude Smith Field • Macon, GA ||  ||  ||  ||  ||  ||  ||
|- align="center" bgcolor=""
| 4 || February 20 || vs.  ||  || Jim Perry Stadium • Buies Creek, NC ||  ||  ||  ||  ||  ||  ||
|- align="center" bgcolor=""
| 5 || February 20 || at  ||  || Jim Perry Stadium • Buies Creek, NC ||  ||  ||  ||  ||  ||  ||
|- align="center" bgcolor=""
| 6 || February 21 || vs. Rider ||  || Jim Perry Stadium • Buies Creek, NC ||  ||  ||  ||  ||  ||  ||
|- align="center" bgcolor=""
| 7 || February 22 || at Campbell ||  || Jim Perry Stadium • Buies Creek, NC ||  ||  ||  ||  ||  ||  ||
|- align="center" bgcolor=""
| 8 || February 24 ||  ||  || English Field • Blacksburg, VA ||  ||  ||  ||  ||  ||  ||
|- align="center" bgcolor=""
| 9 || February 27 ||  ||  || English Field • Blacksburg, VA ||  ||  ||  ||  ||  ||  ||
|- align="center" bgcolor=""
| 10 || February 28 || Toledo ||  || English Field • Blacksburg, VA ||  ||  ||  ||  ||  ||  ||
|- align="center" bgcolor=""
| 11 || February 28 || Toledo ||  || English Field • Blacksburg, VA ||  ||  ||  ||  ||  ||  ||
|-

|- align="center" bgcolor=""
| 12 || March 1 || Toledo ||  || English Field • Blacksburg, VA ||  ||  ||  ||  ||  ||  ||
|- align="center" bgcolor=""
| 13 || March 3 ||  ||  || English Field • Blacksburg, VA ||  ||  ||  ||  ||  ||  ||
|- align="center" bgcolor=""
| 14 || March 4 || College of Charleston ||  || English Field • Blacksburg, VA ||  ||  ||  ||  ||  ||  ||
|- align="center" bgcolor=""
| 15 || March 6 || at Wake Forest ||  || Wake Forest Baseball Park • Winston-Salem, NC ||  ||  ||  ||  ||  ||  ||
|- align="center" bgcolor=""
| 16 || March 7 || at Wake Forest ||  || Wake Forest Baseball Park • Winston-Salem, NC ||  ||  ||  ||  ||  ||  ||
|- align="center" bgcolor=""
| 17 || March 8 || at Wake Forest ||  || Wake Forest Baseball Park • Winston-Salem, NC ||  ||  ||  ||  ||  ||  ||
|- align="center" bgcolor=""
| 18 || March 10 || at  ||  || Plumeri Park • Williamsburg, VA ||  ||  ||  ||  ||  ||  ||
|- align="center" bgcolor=""
| 19 || March 11 || at William & Mary ||  || Plumeri Park • Williamsburg, VA ||  ||  ||  ||  ||  ||  ||
|- align="center" bgcolor=""
| 20 || March 13 || Virginia ||  || English Field • Blacksburg, VA ||  ||  ||  ||  ||  ||  ||
|- align="center" bgcolor=""
| 21 || March 14 || Virginia ||  || English Field • Blacksburg, VA ||  ||  ||  ||  ||  ||  ||
|- align="center" bgcolor=""
| 22 || March 15 || Virginia ||  || English Field • Blacksburg, VA ||  ||  ||  ||  ||  ||  ||
|- align="center" bgcolor=""
| 23 || March 17 ||  ||  || English Field • Blacksburg, VA ||  ||  ||  ||  ||  ||  ||
|- align="center" bgcolor=""
| 24 || March 18 || Radford ||  || English Field • Blacksburg, VA ||  ||  ||  ||  ||  ||  ||
|- align="center" bgcolor=""
| 25 || March 20 || Clemson ||  || English Field • Blacksburg, VA ||  ||  ||  ||  ||  ||  ||
|- align="center" bgcolor=""
| 26 || March 21 || Clemson ||  || English Field • Blacksburg, VA ||  ||  ||  ||  ||  ||  ||
|- align="center" bgcolor=""
| 27 || March 22 || Clemson ||  || English Field • Blacksburg, VA ||  ||  ||  ||  ||  ||  ||
|- align="center" bgcolor=""
| 28 || March 24 ||  ||  || English Field • Blacksburg, VA ||  ||  ||  ||  ||  ||  ||
|- align="center" bgcolor=""
| 29 || March 25 ||  ||  || English Field • Blacksburg, VA ||  ||  ||  ||  ||  ||  ||
|- align="center" bgcolor=""
| 30 || March 27 || at Florida State ||  || Dick Howser Stadium • Tallahassee, FL ||  ||  ||  ||  ||  ||  ||
|- align="center" bgcolor=""
| 31 || March 28 || at Florida State ||  || Dick Howser Stadium • Tallahassee, FL ||  ||  ||  ||  ||  ||  ||
|- align="center" bgcolor=""
| 32 || March 29 || at Florida State ||  || Dick Howser Stadium • Tallahassee, FL ||  ||  ||  ||  ||  ||  ||
|- align="center" bgcolor=""
| 33 || March 31 || VMI ||  || English Field • Blacksburg, VA ||  ||  ||  ||  ||  ||  ||
|-

|- align="center" bgcolor=""
| 34 || April 3 || Georgia Tech ||  || English Field • Blacksburg, VA ||  ||  ||  ||  ||  ||  ||
|- align="center" bgcolor=""
| 35 || April 4 || Georgia Tech ||  || English Field • Blacksburg, VA ||  ||  ||  ||  ||  ||  ||
|- align="center" bgcolor=""
| 36 || April 5 || Georgia Tech ||  || English Field • Blacksburg, VA ||  ||  ||  ||  ||  ||  ||
|- align="center" bgcolor=""
| 37 || April 7 ||  ||  || English Field • Blacksburg, VA ||  ||  ||  ||  ||  ||  ||
|- align="center" bgcolor=""
| 38 || April 10 || at Miami (FL) ||  || Alex Rodriguez Park • Coral Gables, FL ||  ||  ||  ||  ||  ||  ||
|- align="center" bgcolor=""
| 39 || April 11 || at Miami (FL) ||  || Alex Rodriguez Park • Coral Gables, FL ||  ||  ||  ||  ||  ||  ||
|- align="center" bgcolor=""
| 40 || April 12 || at Miami (FL) ||  || Alex Rodriguez Park • Coral Gables, FL ||  ||  ||  ||  ||  ||  ||
|- align="center" bgcolor=""
| 41 || April 15 || at East Tennessee State ||  || Thomas Stadium • Johnson City, TN ||  ||  ||  ||  ||  ||  ||
|- align="center" bgcolor=""
| 42 || April 17 ||  ||  || English Field • Blacksburg, VA ||  ||  ||  ||  ||  ||  ||
|- align="center" bgcolor=""
| 43 || April 18 || North Carolina ||  || English Field • Blacksburg, VA ||  ||  ||  ||  ||  ||  ||
|- align="center" bgcolor=""
| 44 || April 19 || North Carolina ||  || English Field • Blacksburg, VA ||  ||  ||  ||  ||  ||  ||
|- align="center" bgcolor=""
| 45 || April 21 || at Radford ||  || Radford Baseball Stadium • Radford, VA ||  ||  ||  ||  ||  ||  ||
|- align="center" bgcolor=""
| 46 || April 24 || at Duke ||  || Jack Coombs Field • Durham, NC ||  ||  ||  ||  ||  ||  ||
|- align="center" bgcolor=""
| 47 || April 25 || at Duke ||  || Durham Bulls Athletic Park • Durham, NC ||  ||  ||  ||  ||  ||  ||
|- align="center" bgcolor=""
| 48 || April 26 || at Duke ||  || Jack Coombs Field • Durham, NC ||  ||  ||  ||  ||  ||  ||
|- align="center" bgcolor=""
| 49 || April 28 ||  ||  || English Field • Blacksburg, VA ||  ||  ||  ||  ||  ||  ||
|-

|- align="center" bgcolor=""
| 50 || May 1 || Boston College ||  || English Field • Blacksburg, VA ||  ||  ||  ||  ||  ||  ||
|- align="center" bgcolor=""
| 51 || May 2 || Boston College ||  || English Field • Blacksburg, VA ||  ||  ||  ||  ||  ||  ||
|- align="center" bgcolor=""
| 52 || May 3 || Boston College ||  || English Field • Blacksburg, VA ||  ||  ||  ||  ||  ||  ||
|- align="center" bgcolor=""
| 53 || May 5 || West Virginia ||  || English Field • Blacksburg, VA ||  ||  ||  ||  ||  ||  ||
|- align="center" bgcolor=""
| 54 || May 14 || at Pittsburgh ||  || Charles L. Cost Field • Pittsburgh, PA ||  ||  ||  ||  ||  ||  ||
|- align="center" bgcolor=""
| 55 || May 15 || at Pittsburgh ||  || Charles L. Cost Field • Pittsburgh, PA ||  ||  ||  ||  ||  ||  ||
|- align="center" bgcolor=""
| 56 || May 16 || at Pittsburgh ||  || Charles L. Cost Field • Pittsburgh, PA ||  ||  ||  ||  ||  ||  ||
|-

|- 
! style="background:#721227;color:white;"| Post-Season
|-

|- align="center"
|  || May 19 || TBD || || Durham Bulls Athletic Park • Durham, NC ||  ||  ||  ||  ||  ||  || 
|-

|-
| style="font-size:88%"| All rankings from Collegiate Baseball.

References

Virginia Tech Hokies
Virginia Tech Hokies baseball seasons
Virginia Tech